Michael Dwain Timpson (born June 6, 1967) is a former American football player and sprinter.

Early life
Timpson was a track star and multi-sport athlete at Hialeah-Miami Lakes High School in Hialeah, Florida from 1981 to 1985. He won seven track and field titles in high school. Four of those titles were won his senior year at the same track meet. He recorded three state records that day. He was an All-American in track and football.

NFL
He was drafted by the New England Patriots in the fourth round (100th overall), 14th WR of the 1989 NFL Draft, and played for them from 1989 to 1994.  He played with the Chicago Bears in 1995 and 1996, and finished his career with the Philadelphia Eagles in 1997. He retired in 1999.

Track and field
Timpson was an outstanding All-American track and field athlete at Penn State University. He holds the school records in the following events:
200 meters: 20.23 (1986)
55 Meters (Indoors): 6.31 (1986)
200 Meters (Indoors): 21.11 (1989)
300 Meters (Indoors): 33.01 (1986)
400 Meters (Indoors): 46.81 (1987)
55-Meter High Hurdles (Indoors): 7.31 (1986)

His time of 33.01 in the indoor 300 Meters, was an NCAA record. In 1992, he participated in the U.S. Olympic trials in the 200 meters and was a semifinalist.

Personal
Timpson resides in Orlando, Florida with his wife and their two children.

References

External links
Penn State Outdoor Track Records
A proud alumnus: Catching up with Michael Timpson, boston.com, March 2, 2005

1967 births
Living people
New England Patriots players
Penn State Nittany Lions football players
American football wide receivers
Philadelphia Eagles players
Chicago Bears players
American male sprinters
People from Baxley, Georgia
Sportspeople from Miami-Dade County, Florida
Players of American football from Georgia (U.S. state)
Players of American football from Florida